Nick Blood (born 20 March 1982) is an English actor. He is known for his roles as Lance Hunter in Marvel's  Agents of S.H.I.E.L.D. and Kieran in Trollied.

Early life
Blood was born in Aylesbury, England. He joined his local drama club at the age of 7 and soon realized that he wanted to become an actor. Blood went to local school Wingrave C&E before he was a pupil at Sir Henry Floyd Grammar School in Aylesbury, and attending Bristol University. He found his pathway into acting via the ITV Drama Club.  Blood subsequently attended the London Academy of Music and Dramatic Art.

Career

Film and television
Blood's first acting role came in the 25th series of The Bill in a two-episode story of an armed robbery at a toy shop.

He had a role as Alex, Ali's gay flatmate who works as a designer, in the BBC drama Material Girl (2010).

In 2011, he appeared in the Channel 4 drama Misfits as the coma victim, Dom, Jen's boyfriend. In 2011, he was announced to play the role of Kieran, a butcher, in fictitious "Valco" in the Sky1 sitcom Trollied. Blood left the show in the finale of Season 3.

In 2012, Blood gained his first feature film role as Davy Famous in Spike Island.

In 2013, he appeared in the final season of Him & Her as Becky's ex-boyfriend, Lee. Him & Her appears on BBC Three. Lee is a charming young lad which Becky's parents adore very much and prefer to be Becky's boyfriend more than Steve, who is played by Russell Tovey, and is Becky's fiancé. In 2014, Blood appeared in ITV's mystery drama The Bletchley Circle, as Ben, a police officer. Blood also appeared in the Channel 4 police comedy-satire Babylon. He also provides a voice in the video game Dragon Age: Inquisition. In 2018, he played Adam in the indie thriller, Still. 

Blood became a regular on the second season of Marvel's Agents of S.H.I.E.L.D. as Lance Hunter, a mercenary whom Coulson turns to for help and who agrees to join S.H.I.E.L.D. His character is later forced to retire from S.H.I.E.L.D. prior to the season 3 finale. He returns in season 5's episode "Rewind."

Theatre
In 2009, Blood formed a theatre company called "WE. BUY. GOLD" with his friend at LAMDA, Tom McCall.

WE. BUY. GOLD.'s debut show, Inches Apart, which was co-written and starred Blood, was entered into the Old Vic New Voices Theatre503 Award, which it subsequently won. The Old Vic then produced a full professional production at Theatre503, which ran from 12 May to 13 June 2009.

Blood made his professional stage debut in 2009 in The Priory as Adam, at the Royal Court Theatre which ran from 19 November 2009 to 16 January 2010. In 2010, he went on to perform as Sordido in a modern adaptation of the Jacobean tragedy Women Beware Women at the National Theatre, directed by award-winning Marianne Elliott.

In 2011, he appeared in Backbeat which told the story of the formation and early years of The Beatles. It ran in the Duke of York's Theatre from 10 October 2011 to 18 February 2012, and Blood played the lead role of the "fifth Beatle" Stuart Sutcliffe. Due to the musical nature of the role he has learned to play bass guitar, and also subsequently joined a band, Shaaark. The show was an overwhelming critical success during its West End run. This success took the show to Toronto, Ontario, Canada, from 24 August 2012 to 31 August 2012, for a run of seven days.

Personal life
Blood is a lifelong supporter of Liverpool F.C.

Filmography

Film

Television

Video games

References

External links

 

English male film actors
English male television actors
1982 births
Living people
English male musical theatre actors
Male actors from London
Alumni of the London Academy of Music and Dramatic Art
English male video game actors
English male voice actors
21st-century English male actors